Within boating, Raid is described as a sail and oar adventure, a leisure pursuit combining sailing and rowing. It involves a fleet of small boats capable of being rowed and sailed, exploring a coastline or inland waterway over several days, often with some competitive element. 
In describing raiding, the organiser of the 2010 & 2011 English Raids states; "The idea of making coastal voyages in company, in open boats powered by sail and oar, was given currency by the French group Albacore, led by Charles-Henri le Moing during the 1990s, starting in Portugal and Scotland... The word raid has slipped into English and lost its usual associations of pillage and destruction – to those who participate at least."

In Australia, RAID Sydney and RAID Port Macquarie began as Facebook groups that adopted the 'raid' concept, but without emphasising the rowing element, many dinghies being  fitted with small outboard motors, including electric outboards. Their focus is on day-sailing on local waterways in non-competition-focused gatherings, and on multi-day, overnight camping 'raids', where sailors sleep either aboard or on shore at non-commercial campsites. This model is more akin with that of the 'Dinghy Cruising' fraternity, but less formal, less organised, with events often organically generated. One person posts they intend to visit a certain location at a certain day/time, and others choose to join them. Essentially a group of near-strangers sailing in company, no prizes, no fees and, as the participants insist 'no BS'!

Raiding has become increasingly popular amongst small-boat sailors, and this has fostered the development of raid-worthy boats.  Examples of the type include:-
American whaleboat "Molly" crewed by The Henley Whalers.
Morbic 12 and other designs by French Naval architect Francois Vivier.

Raiding is not only an enjoyable outdoor activity, it has been noted to promote family participation.

Examples
Other extant examples of this type of raid include:
 Dorestad Raid
 Raid Finland, established 2002
 Sail Caledonia
 Semaine du Golfe de Morbihan.
 The Vela Raid in Venice
 Shipyard Raid 
 Raid Poland (active)
 Croisiere Loire 
 Small Reach Regatta 
 Tawe Nunnugah, every 2 years since 2007, Tasmania 
 Everglades Challenge
 Texas200, since 2008

Further reading 
• “Hooked on Raiding”
 and in “Raid Boats International”
 UK Morbic Network

The concept of sail and oar raiding is not new; The Vikings were infamous for it

References

External links 
English Raid

Boating